Leicester King (born in Suffield, Connecticut, May 1, 1789 – September 19, 1856) was a 19th-century businessman, judge, and state senator in the Ohio General Assembly.

Married to Julia Ann Huntington, he moved to Warren, Ohio in 1817, where he worked as a mercantilist until 1833. After leaving the mercantile business, he devoted his time to the building of the Pennsylvania and Ohio Canal until being appointed associate judge of the Trumbull County Court of Common Pleas.
 
In 1835, King, a staunch abolitionist, was elected to the Ohio Senate, where he served two terms, until 1839. He was a member of the Whig Party before joining the Liberty Party in 1842. He was Liberty Party candidate for Ohio Governor in 1842 and 1844. King was nominated as Vice President on the Liberty Party ticket for the 1848 United States Presidential Election but declined the nomination.

King died September 19, 1856. He is buried in Oakwood Cemetery in Warren, Ohio.

References 

1789 births
1856 deaths
Politicians from Warren, Ohio
Ohio state senators
Ohio Libertyites
Ohio Whigs
19th-century American politicians
People from Suffield, Connecticut
Activists from Ohio